Joel Sala (born 30 October 2006) is a professional footballer who plays for Watford F.C. Academy. Born in England, he represents Albania internationally at youth level.

References

Living people
2006 births